T50, T-50, or T.50 may refer to :

Military and aviation
 T-50 tank, a World War II Soviet Union light tank 
 Cessna T-50, the commercial version of the American AT-17 aircraft of the 1930s
 KAI T-50 Golden Eagle, a 2005 South Korean/American trainer jet
 Sukhoi T-50, the internal designation for Sukhoi Su-57 fifth-generation stealth fighter jet
 Slingsby T.50 Skylark 4, a model of the Slingsby Skylark glider
 MKE T-50, an upgrade of the HK33 assault rifle by the Turkish state-owned arms company MKE

Mechanics and engineering
 Boeing T50 small turboshaft engine
 Borg-Warner T-50 transmission, a 1970s gearbox used in the Chevrolet Monza and other H-body cars
 Gordon Murray Automotive T.50, a car designed and manufactured by Gordon Murray Automotive

Other
 T.50 (standard), an ITU standard defining an International Reference Alphabet (formerly International Alphabet No. 5, IA5)
 Canon T50, a single-lens reflex film camera
 DSC-T50, a Sony Cyber-shot T series digital still camera